Marsh Butte is a  summit located in the Grand Canyon, in Coconino County in the northern part of the U.S. state of Arizona. It is situated eight miles northwest of Grand Canyon Village, immediately east-northeast of Diana Temple, and Tower of Ra stands directly opposite across Granite Gorge.

Marsh Butte is composed of Mississippian Redwall Limestone, overlaying the Cambrian Tonto Group, and finally granite of the Paleoproterozoic Vishnu Basement Rocks at river level in Granite Gorge. According to the Köppen climate classification system, Marsh Butte is located in a cold semi-arid climate zone.

History

In March 1906, this butte was officially named "Endymion Dome", for Endymion of Greek mythology, in keeping with Clarence Dutton's practice of naming geographical features in the Grand Canyon after mythological deities. However, George Wharton James suggested it should be named after preeminent paleontologist Othniel Charles Marsh (1831–1899), and two months later it was officially renamed in May 1906 by the U.S. Board on Geographic Names. George Wharton James described it in his 1910 book "The Grand Canyon of Arizona How to See It" as "a butte of singularly beautiful structure."

See also
 Geology of the Grand Canyon area

Gallery

References

External links

 Weather forecast: National Weather Service
 Climbing Marsh Butte: Themtsarecalling.com

Grand Canyon
Landforms of Coconino County, Arizona
Colorado Plateau
Grand Canyon National Park
North American 1000 m summits
Buttes of Arizona
Grand Canyon, South Rim
Grand Canyon, South Rim (west)